Spirits is the 1994 album by Gil Scott-Heron. The title track is an interpretation of the John Coltrane piece Equinox, and "The Other Side" is a live version of Scott-Heron's 1971 track "Home is Where the Hatred Is" with a new arrangement and many new verses that expand the original to nearly twenty minutes. It was later sampled for "Home" on the 2011 Jamie XX collaboration album, We're New Here.

In the liner notes, Scott-Heron discusses the new, jazzier tone of the record, and the attempts to define his sound: 
What do you call reggae, blues, African vibration, jazz, salsa, chants and poetry?... Seriously trying to define it, I've said it's Black music. Or Black American music. Because Black Americans are now a tremendously diverse essence of all the places we've come from and the music and rhythms we brought with us.

This was Scott-Heron's first album in twelve years, and it would be sixteen more years before he would release another. "Lady's Song" and "Work for Peace" were omitted from the vinyl issue, while other songs were edited slightly for runtime.

Track listing
All lyrics and music composed by Gil Scott-Heron; except where indicated

CD
"Message to the Messengers" (4:57)
"Spirits" (John Coltrane) (7:49)
"Give Her a Call" (5:44)
"Lady's Song" (3:14)
"Spirits Past" (music: Brian Jackson) (3:00)
"The Other Side, Part I" (5:25)
"The Other Side, Part II" (6:11)
"The Other Side, Part III" (6:40)
"Work for Peace" (7:33)
"Don't Give Up" (music: Ali Shaheed Muhammad) (5:58)

LP
"Message to the Messengers"
"Spirits"
"Give Her a Call"
"Spirits Past"
"The Other Side" (Parts I-III) 
"Don't Give Up"

Personnel
Gil Scott-Heron - vocals, piano
Ed Brady - guitar
Fima Ephron, Robbie Gordon - bass guitar
Malcolm Cecil - bass guitar, piano
Brian Jackson, Kim Jordan, Vernard Dickson - piano
Rodney Youngs - drums
Larry McDonald, Tony Duncanson - percussion
Leon William, Ron Holloway - saxophone
Ibrahim Shakur - flute

References

Gil Scott-Heron albums
1994 albums
Albums produced by Malcolm Cecil